The Railway viaduct in Gorzów Wielkopolski is a historic viaduct carrying the railway line No. 203 Kostrzyn - Tczew over the Warta river in Gorzow Wielkopolski in western Poland, in Lubusz Voivodeship. This viaduct is the longest monument of technology in Poland.

History

Building 

In the years 1856-1859 a single-track line of Royal-Prussian Eastern Railway was constructed, connecting Berlin and Konigsberg. In the year 1905-1914 two-track line was built, which led within the city by 1300 m long flyover.

Specification railway overpass 

The construction has about 70 vaults of parabolic-shaped arches, separated by steel viaducts. The vaults are supported by reinforced concrete pillars and are facet with brick or plaster. Architectural decoration is rusticated for some pillars and cornices of block for others.

Uniqueness 

The entire longest one in Poland and is a unique monument of technology with over regional historical values of architectural space.

References

Gorzów Wielkopolski
Gorzów Wielkopolski
Railway bridges in Poland